

Women's 100 m Breaststroke - Final

Women's 100 m Breaststroke - Semifinals

Women's 100 m Breaststroke - Semifinal 01

Women's 100 m Breaststroke - Semifinal 02

Women's 100 m Breaststroke - Heats

Women's 100 m Breaststroke - Heat 01

Women's 100 m Breaststroke - Heat 02

Women's 100 m Breaststroke - Heat 03

References

Commonwealth Games
100 metres breaststroke
2006 in women's swimming